G.a.S – Gangsta and Street is a mixtape by rappers Young Buck & Tha City Paper. The mixtape features exclusive tracks and freestyles from Tha City Paper & Young Buck.

Background
This is the first project Tha City Paper will release through Ca$hville Records since signing to the label in early 2012.

Young Buck released the first single off the mixtape called "Oh Lord" when he posted it to his ReverbNation account then tweeted it to his fans from his official Twitter account on June 17, 2012.

Track list

References

External links
 
 
 

2012 mixtape albums
Young Buck albums
Albums produced by Drumma Boy